Gaza Surf Club is a 2016 German documentary film directed by Philip Gnadt and Mickey Yamine. It was screened in the Documentaries section at the 2016 Toronto International Film Festival.

See also 
 God Went Surfing with the Devil, a related documentary film

References

External links
 

2016 films
2016 documentary films
German documentary films
2010s Arabic-language films
Documentary films about surfing
Surfing in the Gaza Strip
Films set in the Gaza Strip
2010s German films